Firth, Pond & Company was an American music company that published sheet music  and distributed musical instruments in the 19th and early 20th centuries. The company began in 1847 when William Hall broke with partners John Firth and Sylvanus Pond, thus disbanding their New York-based publishing company, Firth & Hall.

Firth and Pond reformed under the name Firth, Pond & Company. Publishing of sheet music made up their core business, and the company played a key role in the popularizing of works by songwriters such as Stephen Foster and Dan Emmett. They preferred material from the minstrel shows to more serious fare, although the company did publish material such as Foster's non-blackface ballads and songs by Louis Moreau Gottschalk.

In the 1850s, demand steadily grew in the United States for guitars. Firth, Pond & Company offered the instruments under its imprint, advertising, "Guitars of Our Own  Manufacture, of Superior Tone and Finish, in Lined Case, for $15 to $50". These were actually created by guitar makers such as C. F. Martin and James Ashborn. By 1855, Firth, Pond & Company sold $50,000 in pianos and $30,000 in guitars and other instruments; sheet music revenues were $70,000.

When Firth and Pond parted ways, the company split into Firth, Son & Company and William Pond & Company. Firth, Son & Company was acquired by Oliver Ditson & Co. in 1867. William Pond & Company ceased in 1917; its catalog was eventually acquired by Carl Fischer Music.

Notes

References
 Emerson, Ken (1997). Doo-Dah! Stephen Foster and the Rise of American Popular Culture. Da Capo Press.
 Gura, Philip F. (2003). C. F. Martin and His Guitars, 1796–1873. The University of North Carolina Press.
 Starr, S. Frederick (1995). Louis Moreau Gottschalk. University of Illinois Press.

Further reading
  Lifetime-charts of the lives of Firth, Hall and Pond and the fates of their respective businesses, and their relations with the flute world.

Music publishing companies of the United States

Publishing companies established in 1847
1847 establishments in New York (state)
Stephen Foster